The Minister of State for Media, Tourism and Creative Industries is a mid-level position in the Department for Culture, Media and Sport in the British government. It is currently held by Julia Lopez and was previously held by John Whittingdale and Matt Warman respectively.

Responsibilities 
The minister has responsibility of the following policy areas:

Media
Creative Industries
Tourism
Legislation
Corporate
Arts and Heritage in the Commons

List of ministers

References 

Department for Digital, Culture, Media and Sport
Media and Data